An alleged member of the Palestine Liberation Organization (PLO), Wahid Khalil Baroud (وحيد خليل بارود) was arrested in Mississauga, Ontario in 1994 after it was claimed that he served as a bodyguard to Yasser Arafat.

Immigration to Canada
In 1991, Baroud took his wife and three children to Greece, before flying into Pearson International Airport with forged Egyptian passports, and applying for Canadian residency. The family, which would grow with the births in Canada of two more children, claimed to be Israeli, but Baroud acknowledged his time in Fatah, noting that he had never been involved in any terrorism. He claimed to be defecting because he refused to follow an order to travel to Saudi Arabia's border with Iraqi-controlled Kuwait, where some allege he had been ordered to be killed by the PLO authorities. He stated that, as a Palestinian, he refused to be a party to another occupying power like Saddam Hussein.

He was held in detention for 41 days before it was determined he was not a threat, and he was subsequently released.

Arrest

Three years later, after he ostensibly missed two immigration hearings which he claims to have never received notice of, a warrant was issued and he was declared a threat to national security under the auspice that he had served in Force 17 as a bodyguard to Arafat, and was stationed in Syria, Lebanon, Libya and Greece and engaged in terrorism. He was arrested on a security certificate signed by Immigration Minister Sergio Marchi and Solicitor General Herb Gray on June 6, 1994, but Federal Court of Canada  judge Pierre Denault ruled that the government was wrong in suggesting it had evidence Baroud was involved in terrorism. Baroud argued that section 40.1 of the Immigration Act was unconstitutional and breached the Canadian Charter of Rights and Freedoms.

When the courts nevertheless upheld his deportation, he sought leave to appeal to the Supreme Court claiming that the Canadian Security Intelligence Service (CSIS) had tried to convince him to become an informant and turned against him when he refused, but was denied on June 15.

"Depressed and discouraged" at his long time spent in the Don Jail, Baroud agreed to voluntarily drop his appeals and allow himself to be removed from Canada and was subsequently moved to Toronto West Detention Centre.

Unsuccessful deportation
His wife and three eldest children were granted refugee status in Canada. Since he was a stateless Palestinian, there was no country to which he could be safely deported, and his wife ended up acquiring an entry visa for him to Algeria, and he was put on a plane towards Algeria through Switzerland on July 5, but returned to Canada a week later after Algerian authorities refused to let him enter. It was later revealed that his Canadian escorts had taken him to Casablanca hoping to leave him in Morocco; but while they were themselves "mistakenly left behind" in the North African country, Baroud had simply booked himself a plane back to Canada. In December 1995, his wife secured a 9-month visa for him to the Sudan, and Canada put him on a plane towards the country - however, Sudan refused to accept him when they learned of the case.

He was forced to live in airports for eight months, shuttling between countries.

Some sources suggest he ended up in Syria. Baroud later flew to Romania where he lived in the airport for a number of months before finding his way to Switzerland where he appealed to the Supreme Court for the right to remain. He finally settled in Belgium and he is welcomed as a Belgian citizen.

References
Notes

Bodyguards
Naturalised citizens of Belgium
Living people
Palestinian emigrants to Belgium
1950 births
Stateless people
Palestinian people imprisoned abroad